The 2019 Taraba State gubernatorial election occurred on March 9, 2019. Incumbent People's Democratic Party Governor Darius Ishaku won re-election for a second term in 12 local government areas, defeating former acting governor and All Progressives Congress's Sani Danladi who won in the remaining four with a margin of 157,69[8] votes, and several minor party candidates.

Darius Dickson Ishaku emerged unopposed in the People's Democratic Party gubernatorial primary as the sole candidate. His running mate was Haruna Manu.

Of the 30 candidates who aspired for the governorship seat, 28 were male, two were female.

Electoral system
The Governor of Taraba State is elected using the plurality voting system.

Primary election

People's Democratic Party primary
The People's Democratic Party primary election was held on September 29, 2018. Darius Ishaku, the incumbent governor, who was the party's sole aspirant, emerged winner with 1,928 delegate votes out of a total of 2,000.

Candidates
Party nominee: Darius Ishaku: incumbent governor.
Running mate: Haruna Manu.

All Progressives Congress primary
The All Progressives Congress primary election was held on October 2, 2018. Sani Danladi, a former deputy and acting governor of the state, was said to have defeated nine other contestants to win the primary election polling 60,629 delegate votes out of a total of 107,387 from across the state's 16 local government areas. His closest rival was Joel Ikenya, with 11,772 votes. However, the results were contested by eight of the ten contestants who sought for its cancellation. The part's problems began earlier in the middle of that year. Danladi got cleared by an Appeal court.

Candidates
Party nominee: Sani Abubakar Danladi.
Running mate: .
 Joel Danlami Ikenya: 1st Runner-up (11,772 votes)
 Garba Umar: 2nd Runner-up (5,504 votes)
 Prof. Sani Yahya: 3rd Runner-up (7,299 votes)
 Bobboi Kaigama: 4th Runner-up (5,530 votes)
 Aliyu Umar: 5th Runner-up (4,638 votes)
 Ezekiel Afukunyo: 6th Runner-up (2,811 votes)
 Chief David Sabo Kente: 7th Runner-up (5,549 votes)
 Ibrahim Tumba: 8th Runner-up (1,828 votes)
 Kabiru Dodo: 9th Runner-up (1,783 votes)

Results
A total of 30 candidates registered with the Independent National Electoral Commission to contest in the election. People's Democratic Party Governor Darius Dickson Ishaku won re-election for a second term, defeating All Progressives Congress's Sani Abubakar Danladi, UDP's Aisha Jummai Alhassan and several minor party candidates. Ishaku polled 520,433 votes representing 57.21% of total vote cast, Danladi 362,735 votes representing 39.87%, and Alhassan 16,289, from across the 16 local government areas. Meanwhile, prior to the election, the APC candidate got disqualified in court over improper declaration of age.

The total number of registered voters in the state was 1,777,105 while 931,539 voters were accredited. The total number of votes cast was 925,320, while the total number of valid votes was 909,716. Total rejected votes were 15,604.

By local government area
The results below were for the two major parties. The total valid votes of 909,716 represents the 30 political parties that participated in the election. Green represents local government areas won by Ishaku. Blue represents local government area won by Danladi.

Aftermath
After the elections, the All Progressives Congress party expressed dissatisfaction with the outcome of the process and vowed to appeal the outcome, legally. News Agency of Nigeria, however, reported the All Progressives Congress filing a suit against the results of the governorship election at the Court of Appeal in Abuja, on September 20, 2019. While the victory accrued to Darius Ishaku was withheld, the appellant's suit was disqualified by virtue of the earlier disqualification of its candidate at the Jalingo Federal High Court on March 6, 2019. The Supreme Court also dismissed the appeal by the All Progressives Congress. The appeal court, nevertheless, declared the People's Democratic Party candidate, Darius Dickson Ishaku, the winner.

References 

Taraba
Gubernatorial election 2019
Taraba State gubernatorial election
2019 Taraba State elections